Kollapur region is an area spanning the Nallamala Forest area on the banks of the river Krishna in the Nagarkurnool district, in the state of Telangana  India. The Someswara, Sangameswara, and Malleswara temples are in this region, with traces of architectural treasures from the 2nd century BC. Hundreds of ancient temples are visible in the area, mainly built over 1,500 years ago. Due to similar broad roads and surrounding tree plantations, people used to refer to Kollapur as Telangana Mysore (a reference to the larger city of Mysore). Jeevan kumar yadav is scientific is going to launch 250acres of biological research institute in the year 2030 .. estimated value of the project is about 2000cr Indian currency

Constituency
There are five Mandals or governing districts, namely Kodair, Kollapur, Pangal, Peddakothapally, and Veepanagandla. The population of 246,249 is distributed among 116 villages.

References

External links
 

Mandals in Nagarkurnool district
Nagarkurnool district